Yang Kyoungjong is the name of a Korean soldier who, according to some, fought in the Imperial Japanese Army, the Soviet Red Army, and later the German Wehrmacht during World War II. If he exists he is the only soldier in recent history thought to have fought on three sides of a war, and this status has earned him recognition.

Existence
Authors Antony Beevor and Steven Zaloga have regarded Yang Kyoungjong's existence as a fact, but both authors do not provide any sources in their books.  A 2005 Korean SBS documentary that focused on his case concluded there was no convincing evidence of his existence. The man with Asian features in the famous image is often linked to Yang Kyoungjong but the identity and ethnicity of those in the photo has never been verified. Historical author Martin K. A. Morgan goes further and says that "Yang Kyoungjong is a person who never existed because he certainly never left us any proof that he ever existed."

World War II
Author Steven Zaloga in his book The Devil's Garden: Rommel's Desperate Defense of Omaha Beach on D-Day provides an unsourced account that Kyoungjong was in Manchuria when he was conscripted into the Kwantung Army of the Imperial Japanese Army to fight against the Soviet Union. At the time, Korea was ruled by Japan.

During the Battle of Khalkhin Gol, he was captured by the Soviet Red Army and sent to a Gulag labor camp. He was sent to the Eastern Front of Europe.

In 1943, he was captured by Wehrmacht soldiers in eastern Ukraine during the Third Battle of Kharkov, and then joined the "Eastern Battalions" to fight for Germany. Yang was sent to Occupied France to serve in a battalion of former Soviet prisoners of war on the Cotentin peninsula in Normandy, close to Utah Beach. After the D-Day landings in northern France by the Allied forces, Yang was captured by paratroopers of the United States Army in June 1944.

The Americans initially believed him to be a Japanese soldier in German uniform; at the time, Lieutenant Robert Brewer of the 506th Parachute Infantry Regiment, 101st Airborne Division, reported that his regiment had captured four Asians in German uniform after the Utah Beach landings, and that initially no one was able to communicate with them. Yang was sent to a prison camp in Britain and later transferred to a camp in the United States.

Later life
Allegedly, Yang Kyoungjong, was a German prisoner-of-war held by the Allies. Ost-Battalion prisoners were not forcibly repatriated to the Soviet Union in 1945-46 and so according to Zaloga he was granted US citizenship.

Identification 

After the invasion of Normandy on D-Day, a photo was taken of an unidentified man in Wehrmacht attire being processed as a prisoner of war. The official caption does not give his name, and instead refers to him as "young Japanese". The current description on the US National Archives refers to him as a "young Japanese man". In the 1994 book D-Day, June 6, 1944: The Climactic Battle of World War II, historian Stephen E. Ambrose wrote about an interview with Brewer, where Brewer recounted the capture of four Koreans in Wehrmacht uniforms. Ambrose wrote that "it seems they had been conscripted into the Japanese army in 1938—Korea was then a Japanese colony—captured by the Red Army in the border battles with Japan in 1939, forced into the Red Army, captured by the Wehrmacht in December 1941 outside Moscow, forced into the German army, and sent to France." He further notes that their further fate was not known, but speculated that they likely were returned to Korea and fought in the Korean War. However, Brewer's account was not associated with the aforementioned photograph.

In 2002, Brewer's account was reported in Korean media. By 2004, the image was associated with Brewer's account and was circulating on the Internet. In the same year, Korean news site DKBNews reported on the image, said to be found on a "community website," and once again recounted the Brewer story. A reader of DKBNews submitted biographical details about the soldier in the image, including his name (Yang Kyoungjong), date of birth, captures, release and death, along with his settlement in Illinois after the war. However, despite the journalist's request for sources, none was provided. The article also noted that it is impossible to determine if the person in the photo is Yang, since there were four Koreans described by Brewer. In December 2005, in response to the image that was widely circulating on the Internet, the Seoul Broadcasting System aired a documentary on the existence of the Asian soldiers who served Nazi Germany and were captured by Allied forces. The documentary concluded that although there had been Asian soldiers in the German Army during World War II, there was no clear evidence for the existence of Yang Kyoungjong.

The identity of the man continues to be a source of speculation. Author Martin Morgan believes the man is not Yang Kyoungjong, but instead an ethnic Georgian from the 795th Georgian Battalion, which was composed of Georgian Osttruppen troops.

Legacy
The story of Yang was the basis for the 2011 South Korean film My Way. The movie follows two characters, a Korean boy named Jun-shik (played by Shin Sang-yeob) and his Japanese pal Tatsuo (played by Sung Yoo-bin). At the time it was billed as the "most expensive Korean film ever", with a budget of around $23 million.

In 2018, a city councillor in St. John's, Newfoundland, used the story of Yang as the basis for an online ad promoting her real estate business, which caused backlash.

See also
 Lauri Törni
 Joseph Beyrle
 Aleksandr Pavlovich Min
 Ivor Thord-Gray
 Apolonio de Carvalho

Bibliography
Notes

References 
 - Total pages: 768 
 - Total pages: 880

 - Total pages: 240 

 - Total pages: 288 

1920 births
1992 deaths
German Army soldiers  of World War II
Japanese military personnel
Japanese prisoners of war
Korean emigrants to the United States
People whose existence is disputed
Soviet military personnel of World War II
World War II prisoners of war held by Germany
World War II prisoners of war held by the United States
World War II prisoners of war held by the Soviet Union
People from Pyongyang
Korean expatriates in China